The Pirates of Blood River is a 1962 British adventure film directed by John Gilling and starring Kerwin Mathews, Glenn Corbett, Christopher Lee and Oliver Reed.

Plot
While in a penal colony, Huguenot Jonathan Standing (Kerwin Mathews) is captured by pirates led by Capt. LaRoche (Christopher Lee) who force him to lead them back to his home village to retrieve a treasure supposedly hidden there.

Cast
 Kerwin Mathews ...  Jonathon Standing
 Glenn Corbett ...  Henry
 Christopher Lee ...  Captain LaRoche
 Peter Arne ...  Hench, a pirate
 Marla Landi ...  Bess Standing
 Desmond Llewelyn ... Tom Blackthorne
 Oliver Reed ...  Brocaire, a pirate
 Andrew Keir ...  Jason Standing
 Michael Ripper ...  Mack, a pirate
 David Lodge ...  Smith
 Dennis Waterman ...  Timothy Blackthorne
 Jack Stewart ...  Godfrey Mason
 Marie Devereux as Maggie
 Lorraine Clewes ...  Martha Blackthorne
 Jerold Wells ...  Penal Colony Master
 Diane Aubrey ... Maggie (uncredited)

Production

The film was produced at Bray Studios, Down Place, Oakley Green, Berkshire, England, UK 

Bray Studios was used for internal filming. Outside filming locations were at:

Blackpark Lake, Black Park Country Park, Black Park Road, Wexham, Buckinghamshire, England, UK (Blood River)
 
Burnham Beeches, Buckinghamshire, England, UK (jungle)

Callow Hill Sandpit, Virginia Water, Surrey, England, UK (penal colony)

Reception
The film was issued on a double bill with Mysterious Island - which was Britain's biggest grossing double bill of the year.

Films and Filming said it was the tenth most popular movie in Britain for the year ended 31 October 1962 after The Guns of Navarone, Dr No, The Young Ones, Only Two Can Play, The Road to Hong Kong, Spartacus, The Comancheros, Blue Hawaii, and HMS Defiant.

References

External links 
 

1962 films
British action adventure films
British historical films
Columbia Pictures films
Hammer Film Productions films
Pirate films
Films directed by John Gilling
1960s action adventure films
1960s historical films
Films set in the 17th century
Films shot at Bray Studios
Films with screenplays by Jimmy Sangster
1960s English-language films
1960s British films